The China men's national 3x3 team represents the People's Republic of China in international 3x3 basketball competitions. It is governed by the Chinese Basketball Association.

Competitive record

Olympic Games

3x3 World Cup

Asian Games

See also
China women's national 3x3 team
China men's national basketball team

References

External links

3
Men's national 3x3 basketball teams